Franklin County is a county in the U.S. state of Tennessee. It is located on the eastern boundary of Middle Tennessee in the southern part of the state. As of the 2020 census, the population was 42,774. Its county seat is Winchester. Franklin County is part of the Tullahoma-Manchester, TN Micropolitan Statistical Area.

History
White settlement began around 1800, and the county was formally organized in 1807 and named for Benjamin Franklin.  During the next several decades, the size of the county was reduced several times by reorganizations which created the neighboring counties of Coffee County, Moore County, and Grundy County. One of the most notable early settlers was frontiersman Davy Crockett, who came about 1812 but is not thought to have remained long.

The University of the South, founded by the Episcopal Church, was organized just before the Civil War. It began full operations shortly after hostilities ceased. It encompasses a full university and theological seminary. The University of Tennessee Space Institute is also located in the county.

The area became strongly secessionist before the war. Franklin County formally threatened to secede from Tennessee and join Alabama if Tennessee did not leave the union, which the state did when forced to take sides by Abraham Lincoln. This contrasted sharply with the situation in not distant Winston County, Alabama, which was largely pro-Union and provided more volunteers for the Union than the Confederacy.

During 1863, the Army of Tennessee retreated through the county, leaving it more or less under Union control for the rest of the war, although some guerrilla warfare still took place. Isham G. Harris, the Confederate governor of Tennessee, was from Franklin County. After having his political rights restored after the war, he was chosen to represent the state in the United States Senate.

During the temperance (anti-liquor) agitations of the late 19th century, residents discovered that by a quirk of state law, liquor could be sold only in incorporated towns. As a result, all of the county's towns abolished their charters in order to prohibit the sale of alcohol.

In the 20th century, Franklin County benefited from the flood control and power generation activities of the Tennessee Valley Authority (TVA), built by the President Franklin D. Roosevelt administration during the Great Depression. The TVA helped bring new industry to the area. It also created opportunities for water recreation by making new lakes, but at the same time also displaced many county residents from their soon to be submerged homes. The establishment of the federal Arnold Engineering Development Center, which is partly within the county, helped spur economic growth and technical development. The interstate highway system barely touched the county, but it did provide valuable access on Interstate 24 to nearby Chattanooga.

Two notable figures who were born in the county early in the twentieth century were singer/entertainer Dinah Shore and entrepreneur/philanthropist John Templeton.  He later became a British subject and was awarded a knighthood.

During the last decades of the 19th and the first of the 20th, Tennessee, like other southern states, passed laws and constitutional amendments establishing Jim Crow: racial segregation in public facilities, restrictions of voting for blacks, and similar measures.  There were few violent disturbances in Franklin County compared to many other localities, but it was not until a decade after the historic Brown v. Board of Education court decision that the county's schools were desegregated in 1964 when a lawsuit was won in Sewanee, Tennessee.

Considerable industrial growth occurred in the county in the last decades of the 20th century, including the construction of a large automobile engine plant by the Nissan corporation in Decherd.  An emphasis on tourism also developed, based on Civil War history and local scenic attractions such as the dogwood forests, for which an annual festival is held.

Geography

Franklin is one of Tennessee's southern tier of counties and abuts the Alabama border. The county is well watered and forested, and except for the steeper areas of the plateau is well suited for agriculture, having a long growing season and mild winters.

Lost Cove Cave, located near Sherwood, is in the Carter State Natural Area. One of its entrances is known as the Buggytop Cave Entrance and another entrance is known as the Peter Cave Entrance.

Adjacent counties
Coffee County (north)
Grundy County (northeast)
Marion County (east)
Jackson County, Alabama (south)
Madison County, Alabama (southwest)
Lincoln County (west)
Moore County (northwest)

State protected areas
Bear Hollow Wildlife Management Area
Carter State Natural Area
Franklin State Forest (part)
Hawkins Cove State Natural Area
Mingo Swamp Wildlife Management Area
Natural Bridge State Natural Area
Owl Hollow Mill Wildlife Management Area
South Cumberland State Park (part)
Tims Ford State Park
Walls of Jericho State Natural Area

Other protected areas
 Tims Ford Lake
 Woods Reservoir

Demographics

2020 census

As of the 2020 United States census, there were 42,774 people, 16,326 households, and 11,197 families residing in the county.

2000 census
As of the census of 2000, there were 39,270 people, 15,003 households, and 11,162 families residing in the county.

The racial makeup of the county was 92.20% White or European American, 5.49% Black or African American, 0.20% Native American, 0.41% Asian, 0.03% Pacific Islander, 0.60% from other races, and 1.06% from two or more races. 1.58% of the population were Hispanic or Latino of any race.

In the county, the population was spread out, with 23.00% under the age of 18, 10.90% from 18 to 24, 26.40% from 25 to 44, 24.40% from 45 to 64, and 15.20% who were 65 years of age or older. The median age was 38 years. For every 100 females, there were 94.80 males. For every 100 females age 18 and over, there were 92.80 males.

The median income for a household in the county was $36,044, and the median income for a family was $42,279. Males had a median income of $31,506 versus $21,479 for females. The per capita income for the county was $17,987. About 9.60% of families and 13.20% of the population were below the poverty line, including 17.00% of those under age 18 and 13.00% of those age 65 or over.

Communities

Cities
 Cowan
 Decherd
 Tullahoma (partial)
 Winchester (county seat)

Towns
 Estill Springs
 Huntland
 Monteagle (also in Marion and Grundy Counties)

Census-designated place
 Sewanee

Unincorporated communities

 Alto
 Asia
 Beech Hill
 Belvidere
 Broadview
 Midway
 Shady Grove
 Sherwood

Notable people
Stephen Adams (1807–1857), United States Senator and Representative
James Patton Anderson, (1822–1873), born in Franklin County, Confederate Army general 
Jimmy Bedford (1940–2009), sixth master distiller at Jack Daniel's.
Phillip Fulmer (b. 1950), former head coach of the Tennessee Volunteers football team
Bernie Moore (1895–1967), commissioner of the Southeastern Conference
Dinah Shore (1916–1994), singer, actress, and television celebrity
John Templeton (1912–2008), investor and philanthropist

Politics
Franklin County has become a Republican stronghold in recent years. The last Democrat to carry this county was Al Gore in 2000. Prior to 2004, the only Republican to win the county in a 20th-century presidential election was Richard Nixon in 1972.

See also

 National Register of Historic Places listings in Franklin County, Tennessee

References

External links

 Official site
 Franklin County Chamber of Commerce
 Franklin County Schools
 Franklin County, TNGenWeb – genealogy resources
 History of Franklin County, transcribed from Goodspeed's History of Tennessee (1886–1887)
 Franklin County Landforms

 
1807 establishments in Tennessee
Populated places established in 1807
Tullahoma, Tennessee micropolitan area
Middle Tennessee
Counties of Appalachia